Charles Edwin Herzig (August 14, 1929 – September 7, 1991) was an American prelate of the Roman Catholic Church.  He served as the first bishop of the Diocese of Tyler in Texas from 1987 until his death in 1991.

Biography
Charles Herzig was born on August 14, 1929, in San Antonio, Texas.  The grandson of a Lutheran minister, Herzig was ordained to the priesthood for the Diocese of Galveston by Archbishop Robert Lucey on May 31, 1955.

On December 12, 1986, Herzig was named bishop of the newly created Diocese of Tyler by Pope John Paul II. Herzig was consecrated on February 24, 1987, by Archbishop Patrick Flores, assisted by Bishop Thomas Tschoepe and Archbishop Michael Sheehan. His personal secretary was Michael Emile Mahfood.

Charles Herzig died of cancer on September 7, 1991 at age 62. The Bishop Charles E. Herzig Humanitarian Award is given out annually by the diocese.

See also

 Catholic Church hierarchy
 Catholic Church in the United States
 Historical list of the Catholic bishops of the United States
 List of Catholic bishops of the United States
 Lists of patriarchs, archbishops, and bishops

Notes

External links 
Roman Catholic Diocese of Tyler

Episcopal succession

People from San Antonio
1929 births
1991 deaths
20th-century Roman Catholic bishops in the United States
Catholics from Texas